Alt-tech are social media platforms and Internet service providers that have become popular among the alt-right, far-right, and others who espouse extreme or fringe opinions, in the belief that these alternatives moderate content less stringently than mainstream internet service providers.

The term has been used to both describe platforms created specifically to cater to extremist users with similar functionality to  mainstream alternatives, as well as more broadly for mainstream platforms that have less stringent content moderation policies, attracting users who were banned or restricted from other mainstream services. In the 2010s and 2020s, some prominent conservatives, banned from other social media platforms, began to post and view content along with their supporters on alt-tech platforms. Several alt-tech platforms describe themselves as protectors of free speech and individual liberty, which some researchers and journalists have described as a cover for far-right userbases and antisemitism on such platforms.

History 
Alt-tech websites were first described as such in the 2010s. They have seen an increase in popularity in the later part of that decade, as well as the early 2020s. This has been attributed, in part, to "deplatforming", bans (see e.g. shadow banning), and restrictions of activity imposed by companies such as Facebook and Twitter, sometimes described pejoratively as "Big Tech". One prominent example is right-wing groups' claims that these companies censor their views.

After the Unite the Right rally in August 2017, Internet companies such as Google, Facebook, and Twitter were criticized for failing to adhere to their own terms of service, and reacted with policies aimed toward deplatforming white supremacists. Hope not Hate researcher Joe Mulhall identified the deplatforming of Britain First in 2018, and Tommy Robinson in 2019, as two major events that spurred British social media users to join alternative platforms. Ethan Zuckerman and Chand Rajendra-Nicolucci further referenced the August 2018 deplatforming of conspiracy theorist Alex Jones as a pivotal moment.

In October 2018, alt-tech platform Gab received extensive public scrutiny following the Pittsburgh synagogue shooting, after it was found that the sole suspect of the attack, Robert Gregory Bowers, had posted a message on Gab indicating an immediate intent to cause harm before the shooting. Bowers had a history of making extreme, antisemitic postings on the site. After the shooting, Gab briefly went offline when it was dropped by its hosting provider and denied service by several payment processors.

The popularity of alt-tech platforms surged in January 2021, when United States president Donald Trump, and many of his prominent followers, were suspended from Twitter and other platforms. Parler, a website with a large proportion of Trump supporters among its userbase, was taken offline when Amazon Web Services suspended their hosting several days after the January 6 storming of the United States Capitol. It was restarted with a new host on February 15, 2021.

In July 2021, an example of alt-tech hardware was announced as the "Freedom Phone"—a smartphone that promoted privacy-oriented features and an "uncensorable" app store. It was found that the device was merely a white-label version of a Chinese smartphone produced by Umidigi, with a modified Android firmware pre-loaded with apps popular among the target audience, and a rebranded version of an open source client for Google Play Store (rather than the independent app store implied in its promotional materials).

By 2022, The New York Times and The Guardian described a crowded marketplace of alt-tech platforms. The Times noted that alt-tech platforms claiming censorship by Twitter, such as Gettr, Parler, and Rumble have mostly advertised themselves on Twitter.

In February 2022, Trump launched a Twitter alternative, Truth Social, after establishing a messaging platform outside of Twitter, such as a discontinued Trump blog. During development, Truth Social did not at first acknowledge using Mastodon's open source code, and was given an ultimatum by Mastodon, quietly admitting to the use of Mastodon code later on. Truth Social's launch was accompanied by substantial technical difficulties. The platform's terms of service include an incongruous clause that users may not "disparage, tarnish, or otherwise harm, in our opinion, us and/or the Site." According to a report from consumer rights group Public Citizen, alt tech platforms with a supposed focus on free speech include the censorship of some liberal and conservative viewpoints, as well as the routine content moderation on other platforms, creating an "echo chamber". Based on the report, Truth Social was found to shadowban users that disagree with the site's narrative as well as a swathe of other content including some conservative content. "Truth Social" has banned content mentioning liberal views on abortion and the Congressional hearings on the January 6th Capitol attack.

Research into alt-tech platforms 
Deen Freelon and colleagues, publishing in Science in September 2020, wrote that some alt-tech websites are specifically dedicated to serving right-wing communities, naming 4chan (founded in 2003), 8chan (2013), Gab (2016), BitChute (2017) and Parler (2018) as examples. They noted that others were more ideologically neutral, such as Discord and Telegram. Discord later worked to remove right-wing extremists from its userbase, and became a more mainstream platform. Joe Mulhall, a senior researcher for the UK anti-racism organization Hope Not Hate, also distinguishes groups of alt-tech platforms: he says that some of them, such as DLive and Telegram, are "co-opted platforms" which have become widely popular among the far-right because of their minimal moderation; others including BitChute, Gab, and Parler are "bespoke platforms" which were created by people who themselves have "far-right leanings". Ethan Zuckerman and Chand Rajendra-Nicolucci, in contrast, described alt-tech services in explicitly political terms in a 2021 article for the Knight First Amendment Institute at Columbia University:

Researchers have also found that alt-tech platforms can also be used by far-right extremists for mobilization and recruitment purposes, which is more dangerous than just spreading their viewpoints.

Austrian researcher Julia Ebner has described alt-tech platforms as "ultra-libertarian".

Platforms 
Some websites and platforms that have been described as alt-tech include:

References 

2010s in Internet culture
2020s in Internet culture
 
Political extremism